The name Henry has been assigned to five tropical cyclones in the Philippines by the PAGASA in the Western Pacific Ocean.

 Typhoon Prapiroon (2006) (T0606, 07W, Henry) – affected the Philippines and China, killing 94.
 Tropical Storm Malou (2010) (T1009, 10W, Henry) – struck Japan.
 Typhoon Matmo (2014) (T1410, 10W, Henry) – affected Taiwan, partially blamed for a plane crash that claimed 48 lives.
 Tropical Storm Son-Tinh (2018) (T1809, 11W, Henry) – severely affected Vietnam and southern China, resulting to at least 173 deaths, with around 98-1,100 others missing due to a dam collapse in Laos.
 Typhoon Hinnamnor (2022) (T2211, 12W, Henry) – affected Japan and South Korea, killing 12.

Pacific typhoon set index articles